Jamie Lawson (born 5 October 1971) is a former Australian rules footballer who played with the Sydney Swans in the Australian Football League (AFL) during the early 1990s.

Lawson, a rover, was recruited from the Sunraysia Football League. An Indigenous Australian, he arrived in what was a bad time for Sydney, with the club finishing with the wooden spoon in three of his four seasons. He had a career high 30 disposals and two goals against fellow cellar dwellers Brisbane at the SCG in 1992.

Aged only 22, his career came to an end late in the 1994 AFL season when he broke his leg at the Melbourne Cricket Ground, playing against Richmond. His fractured tibia led to compartment syndrome and he was forced to retire. He had been in good form prior to the injury, polling Brownlow Medal votes in his previous two games.

References

External links
 
 

1971 births
Living people
Indigenous Australian players of Australian rules football
Australian rules footballers from New South Wales
Sydney Swans players
New South Wales Australian rules football State of Origin players